The 133 Squadron of the Israeli Air Force, also known as the Knights of The Twin Tail, is an F-15A/B/D fighter squadron based at Tel Nof Airbase.

See also
Operation Opera
Tomer Bar
Eitan Ben-Eliyahu
Shimshon Rozen

References

Israeli Air Force squadrons